The 1960 Milan–San Remo was the 51st edition of the Milan–San Remo cycle race and was held on 19 March 1960. The race started in Milan and finished in San Remo. The race was won by René Privat of the Mercier team.

General classification

References

1960
1960 in road cycling
1960 in Italian sport
March 1960 sports events in Europe
1960 Super Prestige Pernod